Szakács is a Hungarian-language surname literally meaning "cook", i.e., it is an occupational surname. The surname may refer to:

Imre Szakács
Györgyi Szakács

Hungarian-language surnames
Occupational surnames